Paolo Emilio Taviani (6 November 1912 – 18 June 2001) was an Italian political leader, economist, and historian of the career of Christopher Columbus. He was a partisan leader in Liguria, a Gold Medal of the Italian resistance movement, then a member of the Consulta (National Assembly gathered to direct the transformation of the monarchy into a Republic) and the Constituent Council, later of the Italian Parliament from 1948 until his death. Several times minister in the Republic’s governments. He was author of studies on economics and important works on Christopher Columbus, University professor and journalist.

Giorgio Napolitano, the then-President of the Republic of Italy, described him as such: "Eminent political and government figure who for decades continued to bear witness to the diversity of ideals that inspired the Resistance."

Biography

Early years (1912–1943)

Taviani was born in Genoa on 6 November 1912. His mother, Elide Banchelli, was an elementary school teacher. His father, Ferdinando, was a headmaster and one of the founders of the Genoese section of the Italian People's Party (1919). After graduating from the Classical “Liceo”, Taviani went on to university where he earned a law degree in 1934. The same year he obtained his journalist’s license and began working for various Catholic oriented newspapers. In 1936 he obtained a second degree in social sciences from the prestigious Scuola Normale Superiore of Pisa ( Collegio Mussolini i.e. present day Sant'Anna School of Advanced Studies) and in 1939 he earned a third degree in Letters and Philosophy from the Catholic University of Milan. The next year he was professor of History and Philosophy in the public “Licei” as well as assistant lecturer in Geography at the University of Genoa. From 1943 he was professor of Demographics in the Faculty of Law in Genoa.

Resistance (1943–1945)
Already in secondary school Taviani joined the catholic group that was most sensitive to social issues. At university he became head of the Genoese branch of FUCI (Federazione Universitaria dei Cattolici Italiani). Following the Lateran Pacts, Taviani, a young man at the time, shared in the illusion that Fascism might one day evolve into a movement for social justice inspired by Catholic values. Consequently, at the age of 18 he joined the PNF. But the fascists’ belligerent policies and, above all, the racial laws of 1938 shattered that illusion. By the eve of the war, Taviani was firmly in the camp of the anti-fascists. On 27 July 1943 just before the fall of the regime, Taviani founded in Liguria the section of the “Partito-Cristiano-Sociale Democratico” (later Christian Democracy, DC) bringing together young people from the Christian Social Movement with the older members of the People's Party.

Immediately after 8 September, under the pseudonym of Riccardo Pittaluga, Taviani founded the Committee for National Liberation in Liguria (CLNL) as representative of the Christian Democracy. His clandestine activities often brought him among the partisans in the mountains (it was in these years that he became close friends with the commanders Aldo Gastaldi, "Bisagno" and Aurelio Ferrando, "Scrivia"). Taviani maintained contacts with Allied military missions that had parachuted behind enemy lines. He was also editor of La Voce d'Italia a banned periodical published by the Resistance in Liguria. Within the CLNL Taviani often argued the need for a single military command that could effectively coordinate the efforts of volunteers from so many different political backgrounds. On the night of 23 April 1945 the CLNL assumed the leadership of the insurrection in Genoa. On the evening of 25 April the German commander surrendered to representatives of the CLNL. The next morning it was Taviani who announced that the city had been liberated in a radio address broadcast by the BBC: "Genoa is free. People of Genoa, rejoice! For the first time in the history of this war a military unit has surrendered to the spontaneous forces of a people: the people of Genoa!" For his activity in the Resistance Taviani would later receive the Gold Medal for Merit in War in Italy, Gold medals for Merit in the United States and the Soviet Union, the title of Grand Official of the Légion d'Honneur in France. Taviani wrote about the Resistance in the Breve storia dell’insurrezione di Genova, in the collection of short stories Pittaluga Racconta as well as in dozens of articles. His early years in the Resistance marked Taviani's entire political career.

From 1963 he was President of Italian Federation of Volunteers for Freedom (FIVL). In 1987 he was appointed President of the Historical Museum of the Liberation of Rome "Via Tasso". On 25 April 1994, he gave a passionate speech in defence of the values of the Resistance during a large demonstration which was strongly opposed by supporters of the Centre-Right coalition. In 2001 Taviani celebrated the first Memorial Day in Italy remembering the mass extermination of Jews at the "Via Tasso" Museum.

From the post-war years to government (1945–1975)

Immediately after the war, Taviani became involved in the task of transforming the monarchy into a republic. Appointed to the Consulta he was later elected to the Constituent Council where he drafted the articles regarding property in the Constitution of the Italian Republic (arts. 41-45 in the final text). In the elections from 1948 to 1976 Taviani always managed to obtain the most votes among the deputies elected from Liguria. From 1947 to 1950 he was first Vice-secretary, then National Political Secretary of the Christian Democratic Party. In the party he always supported the secular basis that De Gasperi had wanted. In 1950 Taviani was head of the Italian delegation in Paris for the Schumann Plan, the first major step towards a united Europe.

Undersecretary to De Gasperi at the Ministry of Foreign Affairs (1951), later Minister for Foreign Trade (1953), then again Minister of Defence (from 1953 to 1958), Taviani supported the choice to enter the Atlantic alliance, though always from a pro-European perspective. He was one of the most stubborn supporters of the ECSC, the EEC and finally the European Union. As Defence Minister he favoured the re-entry of the Federal Republic of Germany into the western Alliance.

From 1953 until 1974 Taviani was minister in every one of Italy’s governments. As Minister of the Interior he was active in the struggle against the mafia and effectively countered both the Neo-Fascists (in 1973 he outlawed the extreme Right wing organisation Ordine Nuovo) and the Red Brigades (in September 1974 were arrested the leaders of the organization R. Curcio and A. Franceschini). Taviani managed to survive the “death sentences” imposed on him by the OAS, the ON and the BR.

Social Christianity, support for NATO, and opening up to the Left

In the eyes of conservatives Taviani’s contribution to the Italian Constitution and his book La Proprietà made him appear to be too close to socialist ideas. But during the first years of the cold war Taviani was one of the firmest supporters of NATO which he viewed as the only possible guarantee of Italy’s security. This position drew criticism from socialists and communists.

In the early 1960s Taviani favoured an alliance between the Christian Democrats and the Socialist Party in the regional government of Liguria which he later supported for years in national governments. In 1964 he firmly refused to accept a proposal by Italy’s President Antonio Segni to head an emergency government as an authoritarian crack down on the communists. In the years that followed Taviani was severely criticised by supporters of the political Right.

After the coup d’état in Chile, Taviani recognised the change that took place in the Italian Communist Party under Enrico Berlinguer. During his final period as Minister of the Interior he expressed appreciation of the aid the PCI provided in countering illegal armed organisations (both from the Right and Left wings). By the end of 1974 Taviani’s position within the Christian Democratic Party had become difficult because many felt he was too far to the Left. Taviani refused offers to compromise and thereafter only accepted institutional appointments but never again took up a post in the government.

Senator for Life (1976–2001)
From 1976 to 1987 Taviani was elected senator of the Italian Republic in Liguria. From 1979 he was President of the Senate’s Foreign Affairs Committee. In 1991 he was appointed “Senator for Life” for “social, literary and scholarly merit”. 
After the dissolution of the Christian Democratic Party Taviani became a member of the new Italian People's Party (in the Centre-Left coalition). In one of his final interviews he expressed the hope that the PPI would join the European social democratic group.

Ideology

Economics
Taviani’s economic thought belongs to a current of Christian Socialism. His critical studies of Marx, Pareto, Smith and Ricardo were influenced by Maritain, Blondel and Mounier. After an interest in his youth for corporativist theories, Taviani developed the idea of a “mixed” economy, a “third way” which would be capable of promoting social justice while getting beyond the opposition between capitalism and socialism. An important event for Taviani was his participation in the drafting of the Codice di Camaldoli, 99 propositions that had been conceived to orient the activities of Catholics in the social, economic and political spheres. Of particular note among Taviani`s economic studies are Problemi economici nei riformatori sociali del Risorgimento italiano; Utilità, economia e morale; Il concetto di utilità nella teoria economica.

Taviani taught the History of Economic Doctrines at the University of Genoa from 1961 to 1986. From 1950 to 1995 Taviani was editor of the journal Civitas which dealt with topics related to economics, contemporary history and international politics.

Personal life

Historian of Christopher Columbus
Taviani’s first publications on Christopher Columbus date back to 1932. But it was in the second half of the 1970s that research on Columbus absorbed a large part of his time. Taviani has left approximately 200 publications on Christopher Columbus (these have been translated English, French, Spanish, German, Portuguese, Hungarian, Turkish, Vietnamese, etc.).). There are two major works: Christopher Columbus. The grand design (1974, ing. ed. 1985) and The voyages of Columbus (1984, ing. ed. 1991). Taviani wrote them by combining a study of primary and secondary sources with a direct geographic analysis of all the places Columbus reached. Taviani compared the various interpretations, pointed out those that were most reliable, provided some new insights and left the field open to further hypotheses whenever it was not possible to overcome any reasonable doubt. He dialogued with scholars from Italy and abroad and managed to achieve a nearly unanimous consensus on a few firm points of historiography.

From the second half of the 1980s Taviani was president of the Scientific Committee for the "Nuova Raccolta Colombiana" (22 works by the most important scholars from Italy and abroad) and he also took part in organising celebrations marking the 500th Anniversary of the Columbus’ discoveries in 1992. His definitive work on the subject appeared in 1996 which summarised and updated all the previous works: Christopher Columbus (three volumes published by the Italian Geographic Society).

Private life

Taviani moved to Rome after the war and lived there for the rest of his life. For purposes of study, institutional postings or simply out of passion, from his youth Taviani made countless trips, visiting every continent, especially the countries of Latin America. Still he always retained close ties to his native Liguria. Every year he spent long periods near Bávari (a suburb of Genoa) in his parents’ modest country house. He was especially fond of the small mountain villages in the upper Val Trebbia where he had seen the Resistance grow against the Nazis and Fascists.

In January 1941 Taviani married Vittoria Festa whom he had met at the University of Genoa: after more than sixty years of marriage they had eight children and twenty grandchildren.

Death
Taviani appeared for the last time on the Italian political stage on 30 May 2001, when he presided as senior member of the Senate’s inaugural session. A few days later he suffered a stroke and died in Rome in the early morning of 18 June. His memoirs came out a few weeks later: Politica a memoria d’uomo. He is buried in Bávari.

Electoral history

Bibliography

Problemi economici nei riformatori sociali del Risorgimento italiano, Milano: Ancora, 1940; Firenze: Le Monnier, 1968.
Prospettive sociali, Milano: Istituto di propaganda libraria, 1943, 1945.
Breve storia dell’insurrezione di Genova, Firenze: Le Monnier, 1945 (12 ed. 1995).
La Proprietà, Roma: Edizioni Studium, 1946.
Utilità, Economia e morale, Milano: Istituto di propaganda libraria, 1946; Firenze: Le Monnier, 1970.
Il Piano Schuman, Roma: Ministero Affari Esteri, 1953; 1954.
Solidarietà atlantica e comunità europea, Firenze: Le Monnier, 1954; 1967.
Principi cristiani e metodo democratico, Firenze: Le Monnier, 1965; 1972.
Il concetto di utilità nella teoria economica, voll. 1-2, Firenze: Le Monnier, 1968–1970; 1973.
Sì alle Regioni, Roma: Edizioni Civitas, 1970.
Cristoforo Colombo. La genesi della grande scoperta, voll. 1-2, Novara: De Agostini, 1974; 1988 (inglish trans.).
Terre di Liguria, Roma: Editalia, 1977.
"La guerra dei cento fronti", in Civitas, 34.1 (1983), pp. 5–9.
I viaggi di Colombo. La grande scoperta, voll. 1-2, Novara: De Agostini, 1984; 1990 (inglish trans.).
‘Presentazione’, in A. Paladini, Via Tasso. Museo Storico della Liberazione di Roma, Roma: Istituto poligrafico dello Stato, 1986, pp. 5–7.
C. Colombo, Il giornale di bordo, tomi 1-2, a cura di P.E. Taviani e C. Varela (‘Nuova raccolta colombiana’, 1), Roma: Istituto poligrafico dello Stato, 1988 (inglish trans.).
Pittaluga racconta, Genova: Ecig, 1988; Bologna: Il Mulino, 1999.
La meravigliosa avventura di Cristoforo Colombo, Novara: De Agostini, 1989; = L’avventura di Cristoforo Colombo, Bologna: Il Mulino, 2001 (tradotto in spagnolo, tedesco, ungherese, vietnamita, Turco).
F. Colombo, Le Historie della vita e dei fatti dell’ammiraglio don Cristoforo Colombo, tomi 1-2, a cura di P.E. Taviani e I.L. Caraci, (‘Nuova raccolta colombiana’, 8), Roma: Istituto Poligrafico dello Stato, 1990 (inglish trans.).
C. Colombo, Relazioni e lettere sul secondo, terzo e quarto viaggio, tomi 1-2, a cura di P.E. Taviani e C. Varela, J. Gil, M. Conti (‘Nuova raccolta colombiana’, 2), Roma: Istituto poligrafico dello Stato, 1992 (inglish trans.).
C. Colombo, Lettere e scritti, tomo 2, a cura di P.E. Taviani e C. Varela (‘Nuova raccolta colombiana’, 3.2), Roma: Istituto poligrafico dello Stato, 1993.
“La questione dell’ordine pubblico (1976-1979)”, in Il Parlamento italiano. 22, Milano: Nuova Cei, 1993, pp. 95–125.
I Giorni di Trieste, Roma: Edizioni Civitas, 1994; Bologna: Il Mulino, 1998.
Cristoforo Colombo, voll. 1-3, Roma: Società Geografica Italiana, 1996 (inglish trans.).
Politica a memoria d’uomo, Bologna: Il Mulino, Bologna, 2001.
Discorsi parlamentari, Bologna: Il Mulino, 2005.

References

External links
 Review of his book Columbus, Erickson, Carolly, "Los Angeles Times", October 13, 1991
 Interviews (INT09 and INT10) with Taviani at the Historical Archives of EU

|-

|-

|-

|-

|-

|-

|-

|-

1912 births
2001 deaths
Politicians from Genoa
Christian Democracy (Italy) politicians
Italian People's Party (1994) politicians
Deputy Prime Ministers of Italy
Finance ministers of Italy
Italian Ministers of the Interior
Italian Ministers of Defence
Members of the National Council (Italy)
Members of the Constituent Assembly of Italy
Deputies of Legislature I of Italy
Deputies of Legislature II of Italy
Deputies of Legislature III of Italy
Deputies of Legislature IV of Italy
Deputies of Legislature V of Italy
Deputies of Legislature VI of Italy
Italian life senators
Italian anti-fascists
Academic staff of the University of Genoa
Italian resistance movement members
Grand Crosses 1st class of the Order of Merit of the Federal Republic of Germany